Rhaphiptera lavaissierorum is a species of beetle in the family Cerambycidae. It was described by Dalens and Tavakilian in 2007. It is known from French Guiana.

References

lavaissierorum
Beetles described in 2007